Ab Ask (also Romanized as Āb-e Ask; also known as Ask) is a village in Bala Larijan Rural District, Larijan District, Amol County, Mazandaran Province, Iran. At the 2006 census, its population was 581, in 170 families.

Ab Ask is famous for its mineral hot springs sources from Mount Damavand, the highest peak in Iran with the elevation of 5610 m above the sea level. Agriculture and Livestock are the main occupation of local residents. Ab Ask is also a very popular fishing spot with an ample amount of red-spot trout fish. The majority of Amol population are originally from Larijan District and those from Ab Ask are known as Aski (from Ab Ask). Most of the Aski people in Amol own a property in Ab Ask and spend their weekends there specifically during spring and summer when the weather is quite cool and pleasant there by driving about 1 hour through Haraz Road.

References 

Populated places in Amol County